Nikola Aistrup (born 22 August 1987 in Ballerup) is a Danish former professional racing cyclist.

Major results

2008
 3rd Road race, National Under-23 Road Championships
2009
 2nd Paris–Roubaix Espoirs
 3rd Fyen Rundt
 6th Road race, UEC European Under-23 Road Championships
2010
 2nd Rogaland GP
 5th Grand Prix de la ville de Pérenchies
2011
 3rd Grand Prix de la Ville de Lillers
 10th Rogaland GP
2012
 1st  Mountains classification Danmark Rundt
 2nd Himmerland Rundt
2013
 6th Ronde van Overijssel
 8th Himmerland Rundt
2014
 1st  Mountains classification Dookoła Mazowsza

References

1987 births
Living people
Danish male cyclists
People from Ballerup
Sportspeople from the Capital Region of Denmark